Navalny is a 2022 documentary film directed by Daniel Roher. The film revolves around Russian opposition leader Alexei Navalny and events related to his poisoning. It was produced by HBO Max and CNN Films. The film premiered on 25 January 2022 at the Sundance Film Festival, where it received critical and audience acclaim and won the Audience Award in the US Documentary competition and the Festival Favorite Award. It also won the Best Documentary Feature at the 95th Academy Awards, won the award for Best Political Documentary at the 7th Critics' Choice Documentary Awards and picked up best documentary at the 76th BAFTA awards ceremony.

Synopsis 
The film tells about the events related to the poisoning of Russian opposition leader Alexei Navalny and the subsequent investigation into the poisoning. On 20 August 2020, Navalny was poisoned with a Novichok nerve agent, falling sick during a flight from Tomsk to Moscow, and was hospitalized in serious condition. Navalny was taken to a hospital in Omsk after an emergency landing there, and put in a coma. Two days later, he was evacuated to the Charité hospital in Berlin, Germany. The use of the nerve agent was confirmed by five Organisation for the Prohibition of Chemical Weapons (OPCW) certified laboratories. Navalny blamed Russian president Vladimir Putin for his poisoning, while the Kremlin has repeatedly denied involvement.

The film shows how Bellingcat journalist Christo Grozev and Maria Pevchikh, the head investigator for Navalny’s Anti-Corruption Foundation, reveal the details of a plot that indicates the involvement of Putin.

The director described the film as "the story of one man and his struggle with an authoritarian regime".

Production 
The project was first announced on 13 January 2021. The film was directed by Canadian documentary filmmaker Daniel Roher, who originally planned to make a film about one of the investigations of Christo Grozev. Filming began shortly after Navalny came out of a coma and went on until his arrest in January 2021: according to the main character of the film, the film crew was next to him even at the border control at the airport.

It was produced by HBO Max and CNN Films in partnership with Fishbowl Films, RaeFilm Studios and Cottage M. The project was produced by Fishbowl Films' Diane Becker and Melanie Miller, Cottage M's Shane Boris, RaeFilm Studios Odessa Rae, CNN Films' Amy Entelis and Courtney Sexton, and Maria Pevchikh.

Release 
The film premiered on 25 January 2022 at the Sundance Film Festival as the final title in the U.S. Documentary Competition section, where it won the Festival Favorite Award and the Audience Award for the U.S. Documentary Competition. In March 2022, Warner Bros. Pictures acquired U.S. distribution rights to the film, and set it for an April 11, and April 12, 2022, release.

The film premiered on 24 April 2022 on CNN in the US, as well as on the streaming platform CNN+. It began streaming on HBO Max on 26 May 2022.

It was shown on BBC2 on 25 March 2022.

Reception 
 

Guardian critic Phil Harrison awarded it 5/5 stars calling it "one of the most jaw-dropping things you'll ever witness", and "this terrifying documentary enters the realms of the far-fetched spy thriller – and yet it's all true". New York Times film critic Ben Kenigsberg added the film to the "Critic's List" and also praised it saying "Roher has assembled a tense and absorbing look at Navalny and his inner circle".

Accolades

References

External links 

 https://navalny-film.io/, Russian internet publication 
 
 

2022 films
American documentary films
Alexei Navalny
2022 documentary films
CNN Films films
Warner Bros. films
Sundance Film Festival award winners
Films directed by Daniel Roher
Films scored by Marius de Vries
Documentary films about Russia
Films about Vladimir Putin
Documentary films about human rights
Documentary films about elections
Documentary films about politicians
Documentary films about historical events
2020s American films
Best Documentary Feature Academy Award winners